Kalanag, born Helmut Ewald Schreiber, (January 23, 1903 in Backnang – December 24, 1963 in Gaildorf) was a German film producer and magician in the German Reich and in the early Federal Republic of Germany.

Life

Early years 

Already in his youth, the son of a factor worker devoted himself intensively to the art of magic and entered the Magic Circle of Germany at the age of 16. He attended secondary school in Stuttgart and later studied at the University of Munich and at the Technical University of Munich.

During his studies of philosophy in Munich, he organized one of the first German magic congresses. At the same time he gained experience as an actor and dramaturg at the Münchner Kammerspiele. From 1925 he worked in the film industry in Berlin. As a production manager, starting in 1926 he was in the silent films Hunt on People (1926), The Man Without a Head (1927), One Against All (1927), The Duty to be Silent (1927), Evidence (1928), The Winner (1928), Marriage in Need (1929), Motherly Love (1929), The Mistress and her Servant (1929) and Innocence (1929).

In 1927 he became editor-in-chief of MAGIE magazine of the Magic Circle. He chose his stage name after the elephant Kala Nag ("Black Snake") from Rudyard Kipling's Jungle Book.

Time of National Socialism 

Due to his good contacts to Propaganda Minister Joseph Goebbels he made his career at the Tobis Film Company. With the onset of the sound film era Schreiber rose to production manager, from 1930 to 1934 he was also active as a motorcycle racer. From summer 1936 he worked as a production group leader, in 1939 he became an executive of the film industry, in June 1942 he finally became production manager in Bavaria and remained there until the end of the war. As author, cameraman, recording and production manager, Schreiber was responsible for a total of 150 films. Schreiber, who belonged to the NSDAP since 1933, prevented the dissolution of the Magic Circle, which, however, from June 1936 as part of the so-called Gleichschaltung forced to the Reich Chamber of Culture (Reichstheater chamber, section Artistics) affiliated. Schreiber got involved with the National Socialists as president of the Magic Circle (1936–1945), membership was reduced from the originally 1373 members to 400 and prevented the use of Jewish compositions as background music. Without belonging to the circle controlled by Schreiber, magicians in Germany were banned from performing which inevitably affected Jewish magicians. In contrast, after the war, Jewish artists defended Kalanag and pointed out that he still kept Jewish personnel in the service of Bavaria for a long time. In 1936 Schreiber was awarded the Hofzinser Ring, which he passed on to Ludwig Hanemann (stage name Punx) in 1948. [3]

After the Anschluss of Austria, Schreiber extended his influence to there. Schreiber became director of the Bavaria Film in Munich, produced public speeches by Adolf Hitler and in 1939 was a guest at the Berghof am Obersalzberg. Schreiber fostered friendship with Hitler's personal adjutant, SS Gruppenführer Julius Schaub, who sponsored magical events. For magicians, uncommonly disliked the public education about fraudulent tricks of spiritualists and threatened traitors even openly with the Gestapo. This attitude may be related to Schreiber's friendship with the Berlin police chief and occultist Wolf-Heinrich Graf von Helldorff, who had once considered the tricky imposter Erik Jan Hanussen to be a real magician. Schreiber propagated the illusion "Simsalabim" as his creation, which historians ascribe to the Danish-American magician Dante.

End of the war 

Towards the end of the war, Schreiber mediated between the Allies and wanted SS men, who offered free access to the legendary stolen gold, which is officially largely lost. Later, when the military police Schreiber wanted to arrest on the Bavaria site, this appeared in the presence of high American military who protected him. As president of the Magic Circle, he was deposed and received from the Allies a professional ban. After a denazification process Schreiber fled to the British occupation zone to Hamburg, where he lived with a magic friend who was known as the "king of the black market" and was later convicted of diamond smuggling with a Swiss magician.

Postwar career 

Since Schreiber had a professional ban in his previous profession, he turned his hobby into a profession in 1947 – at a time when the postwar period was turning into a postwar boom or economic miracle. With the support of former Tobis people, he entertained British occupation soldiers with his Kalanag revue, consisting of elaborate illusions and lightly dressed showgirls.

The most famous numbers included, among others, the Magic Bar dating back to Jean Eugène Robert-Houdin and made famous by David Devant, where the whole idea of a single pitcher was served on demand, as well as for special tricks the saying "And we'll do it all with water from India" poured a spurt of water out of a never-ending carafe on the stage. As the highlight of each performance, he had a car disappear from the brightly lit stage following an idea by Howard Thurston. An important element of his shows was always his wife and partner Gloria de Vos (Anneliese Voss). As his assistant, with the degree of sex appeal and dancer allowed for the time, she gave each performance a special shine. Exoticism was also provided by a cheetah appearing in a box.

Officially it was never known how Schreiber had financed the elaborate show in post-war Germany from scratch. Alone the costs for the disappearing car amounted to the then astronomical sum of 10.000, - DM. Magicians like Janos Bartl or Fredo Marvelli, whom Schreiber had badly harmed during the time of the national socialism, called for the boycott of his shows.

World tours 

In the 1950s, Kalanag toured with his 50-member ensemble tours of Britain, Sweden, Denmark, Spain, South Africa, Brazil, the United States, Turkey and Switzerland. In the summer of 1960 he appeared in the Zwickau Groß-Variete Lindenhof. At that time, Kalanag was the only major illusionist in the world who still toured with such an elaborate show. The magic historian Richard Hatch points out that the traveled countries strikingly match the banknotes that had disappeared in 1945 with the Nazi gold. Supposedly, the CIA has therefore observed Kalanags activities throughout his life. Before and after Kalanag, no other German magician has ever taken the economic risk of such costly world tours. At the end of the 1950s interest in variety shows diminished, which also brought Schreiber into financial difficulties.

Germany television GmbH 

Schreiber became entertainment director in the commercial Free Television Society. The company served the construction of the Germany-Fernsehen GmbH planned by Adenauer, which should have offered a conservative alternative to the broadcasters of the ARD. However, the project failed due to the 1st Broadcasting Judgment of the Federal Constitutional Court.

The later years 

Although Kalanag had achieved a high profile and status, he could not build on his success with a slimmed down version of his revue. In the mid-1950s, Schreiber moved from Hamburg to the Württemberg village of Fornsbach, where his cousin Margarete Sedlmayer owned land and ran a café. Here he built a bungalow with a show stage ("Kalanag Studio"). On January 23, 1963, he celebrated his 60th birthday, but on Christmas Eve 1963 he died of probable heart failure in the Gaildorfer Hospital. According to his daughter Brigitte Löser, "he lived very unhealthily and was very overweight". He left his divorced wife Gloria, a fortune of 500,000 DM. He sought throughout his life a larger treasury from the Nazi gold, of which she also assumed that Schreiber hid somewhere.

References 
 Douglas Botting, Ian Sayer: Nazigold – The Story of the World’s Greatest Robbery – and its Aftermath. London 1984, .
 
 Richard Hatch: Kalanag and the Vanishing Banknotes. In: MAGIC. 1989, S. 48. (englisch)
 Richard Hatch: Das letzte Wort. In: magische welt. 2003, S. 98.
 Wittus Witt, Bernd Heller: Mein Präsident. In magische welt. 2003, S. 98.
 Kay Weniger: Das große Personenlexikon des Films. Die Schauspieler, Regisseure, Kameraleute, Produzenten, Komponisten, Drehbuchautoren, Filmarchitekten, Ausstatter, Kostümbildner, Cutter, Tontechniker, Maskenbildner und Special Effects Designer des 20. Jahrhunderts. Band 7: R – T. Robert Ryan – Lily Tomlin. Schwarzkopf & Schwarzkopf, Berlin 2001, .
 Rolf Aurich: Kalanag. Die kontrollierten Illusionen des Helmut Schreiber. Verbrecher Verlag, Berlin 2016, .
 Benöhr-Laqueur, Susanne: Kanalag: Unergründlicher Opportunist und Antisemit?

External links
IMDB page

People of Nazi Germany
German magicians
1903 births
1963 deaths